In the United States Marine Corps, the logistics combat element (LCE), formerly combat service support element, is the portion of the Marine air-ground task force (MAGTF) responsible with providing logistical support. It provides equipment and personnel to keep the MAGTF running logistically.

The logistics combat element (LCE), organized into battalions, regiments, and groups, has its own headquarters element for command and control (management and planning for manpower, intelligence, operations and training, and logistics functions) of its subordinate units and contains the majority of the combat service support units for the MAGTF, including: heavy motor transport, ground supply, heavy engineer support, ground equipment maintenance, and advanced medical and dental units, along with certain specialized groups such as air delivery, EOD, and landing support teams.

The size of the LCE varies in proportion to the size of the MAGTF. A Marine expeditionary force has a Marine logistics group or MLG. A Marine expeditionary brigade holds a combat logistics regiment or CLR, often reinforced with equipment and personnel from other logistics units. The various Marine expeditionary units command a reinforced combat logistics battalion. Generally, MEF postings are permanent, while MEBs and MEUs rotate their GCE, ACE, and LCE twice annually.

Hierarchy of Marine logistics units



Combat Logistics Regiment 1

Combat Logistics Regiment 15

Combat Logistics Regiment 17



Combat Logistics Regiment 2

Combat Logistics Regiment 25

Combat Logistics Regiment 27



Combat Logistics Regiment 3

Combat Logistics Regiment 35

Combat Logistics Regiment 37



See also
 List of United States Marine Corps Combat Logistics Companies
 Marine Air-Ground Task Force
 List of United States Marine Corps logistics groups
 List of United States Marine Corps regiments
 List of United States Marine Corps battalions

References

United States Marine Corps organization
Logistics of the United States Marine Corps